Nishkarsha (English: Definite Decision) is a 1993 Indian Kannada-language heist thriller directed by Sunil Kumar Desai, starring Vishnuvardhan, Anant Nag and B. C. Patil. The story revolves around a bank robbery where terrorists become trapped with the hostages. It also explores the many travails of the police commissioner and anti-terrorist squad commandos to free the hostages and reign in the terrorists. The film was hailed as a one-of-a-kind in Kannada cinema with its realistic plot elements and that a single location used for most parts of filming.

The film won three awards at the 1993–94 Karnataka State Film Awards — First Best Film, Best Screenplay (Sunil Kumar Desai) and Best Sound Recording (R. Kannan). The movie was partially inspired by L R Ranganath Rao's novel Aa Ombattu Gantegalu  and was conceptualized on Die Hard. The film was dubbed in Telugu as Sanghatana. The movie got re-released in Kannada, Hindi with DTS cinemascope on 20 September 2019.

Plot

The story opens with the kidnapping of an architect (Avinash) at night. He is taken away to a secluded location where he is tortured by unknown assailants for information regarding the structural details of a bank that he helped build. When the torture reaches excruciating levels, the architect gives in and shares the confidential details of the security alarms and safety devices in the bank. It is shown that the leader of the group called Devraj (B. C. Patil) is a terrorist and will stop at nothing to get the bank's money to further his group's operations. It is also shown that he commands a strong team of at least 20 deadly terrorists.

The following morning, the scene opens at Bangalore's Manipal center, the place of the bank that Dev and his associates have planned to rob. It is a normal day, the staff slowly trickle in, and business resumes. Meanwhile, a van that enters into the building, unloads a bunch of carton boxes marked to be delivered to the bank. The boxes are then transferred slowly to the bank premises. Unknown to the security guards, the boxes contain automatic weapons and deadly explosives, which the terrorists plan to use to take control of the bank.

Dev's team tactically disables all the security alarms and safety devices. Once the stage is set, they shoot the security guard, shut the front door, and take all the staff present as hostages. Dev and his assistant force the bank manager to open the safe. As they start looting the safe, another alarm, which Avinash had not revealed to them, goes off. Now, the terrorists find themselves trapped in the bank. No matter how hard they try to break out, they realize that they have painted themselves into a corner. The news spreads and an entire police force descends on Manipal Towers. The Police Commissioner Subhash (Ananth Nag) steps in and assesses the situation. He realizes that he does not command the requisite force to accomplish this task and requests the Chief Minister to dispatch an anti-terrorist squad immediately. The Chief Minister agrees immediately.

Commando Ajay (Vishnuvardhan) is apprised of the situation. He has been a good friend of the Police Commissioner for a long time. He quickly assembles a team and meets with the police commissioner. Commando Ajay takes charge of the operation and learns that the terrorist Dev is the brother of another terrorist who he himself had killed a few years ago. Dev, too, learns that Ajay has been enlisted to supervise this operation and demands that he be taken off the force immediately. When he doesn't oblige, Dev kills the bank manager by throwing him out of the building. The commissioner is left with no choice but to listen to the terrorist.

Soon enough, the police commissioner hatches a plot to bring back Ajay. He orders his fellow officers to bring a large number of pigeons from Shivajinagar. When the pigeons arrive, he informs Ajay of his plan, and when they start flying, Ajay replaces a lookalike commando and takes charge. Meanwhile, the hostages inside grow restless. Fearing that they will all die, they hatch their own plan and attempt a coup. It goes horribly wrong and a few of the hostages get killed. Gundanna (Ramesh Bhat) a lift mechanic, with whom Ajay is in constant touch, acts as a spy and aids Ajay in performing reconnaissance of the terrorists and their activities.

In the end, Ajay infiltrates the terrorist stronghold with the help of his trusted commando (Prakash Raj) and Gundanna. Although the commando valiantly gives up his life and Gundanna is seriously injured, Ajay frees the hostages, kills Devraj, and saves the day.

Cast
 Vishnuvardhan as anti-terrorist commando Ajay Kumar
 Ananth Nag as Police Commissioner Subhash Chandra
 B.C.Patil as Devraj
 Suman Nagarkar as bank employee Suman
 Ramesh Bhat as lift mechanic Gundanna
 Prakash Raj as anti-terrorist Commando Suresh
 Avinash as bank architect Ramakrishna
 Anjana as Durga
 Indudhar as police inspector Praveen
 Thimmayya as Bank manager Vittal Pai 
 Manzoor Khan as Rajendra 
 pailwan venu
 Nanjundi Nagaraj 
 Gurukiran as Baldev
 Rocket Vikram
 Mandeep Rai 
 Vasanth Kunigal 
 Sanketh Kashi 
 Rama Murthy 
 Anjanappa 
 Shankar Bhat 
 K.D.Venkatesh
 Nagesh Maiyya
 Jackie Shivu
 Abhinaya 
 Baby Roopa 
 Agantuka Nagaraj

Box office 
The film was a super hit. The film had a theatrical run of 100 days at centers across Karnataka.

References

External links
 

1994 films
1990s Kannada-language films
Indian thriller films
Films about terrorism in India
Films directed by Sunil Kumar Desai
1994 thriller films